The Three Hummock Island, part of the Hunter Island Group, is a  granite island, located in the Bass Strait near King Island, lying off the north-west coast of Tasmania, Australia.

Part of the island is a nature reserve, with the rest a pastoral lease where farming took place from the mid-1800s to at least the mid-1970s. The focus of human settlement on the island is the homestead at Chimney Corner at the westernmost point. There is an automated lighthouse at Cape Rochon in the north-east, as well as roads, three airstrips, fencing and a wharf. Seasonal muttonbirding occurs in March and April.

Flora and fauna
Much of the island is composed of dense scrub dominated by Leptospermum scoparium, Melaleuca ericifolia and Banksia marginata, while 25% of the area is covered by Eucalyptus nitida woodland.

The island forms part of the Hunter Island Group Important Bird Area.  Breeding seabirds and shorebirds include little penguin, short-tailed shearwater, Pacific gull, pied oystercatcher, sooty oystercatcher and hooded plover.  Mammals include the introduced eastern grey kangaroo, feral cat and house mouse.  Feral sheep were recorded in a 1999 survey.  Tiger snakes are also present.

European settlement

Warne Family 
Elias Albert Warne acquired a lease for the island in 1926. His son Cecil Vernon Warne arrived in February 1926 aboard the Hillsmeads from Melbourne bringing the first ever 500 sheep to the Island, during the following weeks 3 more shipments arrived giving a total of 2,200 sheep. Some cattle were still on the island left by previous leases, they were rounded up, fences repaired and some sold with a bull purchased from Hunter Island.

Cecil Warne had married Dulcie Ruby Trevena two years previously in Birchip, Victoria.

Dulcie had remained in Melbourne for the birth of their first son Colin Robert on 8 April

Cecil returned to Melbourne for the birth and came back with some family members and set about constructing a shearing shed, many fences for sheep pens and even constructed a cement lined sheep dip which still exists under a boxthorn hedge.

They lived in the house built in 1910 and Dulcie baked bread in the big wood oven, made butter and sold some at times. The old house c1850 was recycled for timber and nails to build the Shearing Shed.

Tracks were cleared around the island with only transport being on horseback pulling a sled for new fence posts, tools and sometimes family for a weekend picnic.

In 2 September Shearers arrived and helped with final work on the sheep dip they spent almost five weeks until all sheep were shorn and dipped, with 48 bales of wool sent off to market aboard the Coomonderry.

During their first year (1926) they were able to send to market the following:

Cattle    277      Sheep 704       Butter 9 boxes     Wool 48 bales

Cecil and Dulcie left the island in 1929 and went back to farming in the Mallee.

Elias and other members of the Warne family continued time on the island looking after the stock.

During 1931 Elias advertised the island for ‘stock agistment’.

An auction was held in 1933 for a new 16-year lease and the Nichols Family commenced their time on the Island.

Nichols family
Bill and Amelia ("Ma") Nichols leased Three Hummock Island from 1933 till 1950, and grazed cattle and sheep. They were also involved in fishing and muttonbirding. Over the years they owned several ships including Lady Jean, Lady Flinders,  and Jean Nichols which were used to carry cargo and passengers to and from the Bass Strait islands and to Melbourne and Launceston. They built up a small community of workers on the island, including some of their relations. One of these workers was Peggy Puckett, from Stanley. Her story is told in A Walk Along the Shore in which she describes life on the island with the Nichols family during the six years she lived with them from 1937 to 1943. Mrs Nichols named Peg's Paddock after her, mentioned in both A Walk Along the Shore and Eleanor Alliston's Escape to An Island.

The Nichols family left the island in 1950 and the Alliston family arrived in 1951.

Alliston family
Author Eleanor Alliston wrote Escape to an Island and Island Affair about the life of her family on Three Hummock Island. The two books tell the story of how the Alliston family emigrated from England after the end of World War II to start a new life alone on the island in the hope of providing a better and different childhood for their children. The books have much between the lines left to readers' imaginations. The second book ends in 1984, the island having a population of two—the author and her husband; their four children, who were brought up on the island, having left it, married with families and having a total of ten grandchildren.

In the 1990s one of the Alliston children, Rob, returned to the island to run a tourist venture. The Alliston family sold the lease in 2006.

The book Island Affair contains mention of Giuseppe Garibaldi's visit to the island in 1852 while in exile from Italy as a captain of the trading vessel Carmen.

Caretaker History

Three Hummock Island now operates as an eco-tourism venture with accommodation for up 14 people. Managers John and Beverley O'Brien lived on Three Hummock Island from 2009-2018.

References

External links
Three Hummock Island website

Islands of North West Tasmania
Protected areas of Tasmania
Important Bird Areas of Tasmania
Islands of Australia (Tenure: State Reserve)
Localities of Circular Head Council
Islands of Bass Strait